Maxwell Tylden Masters FRS (15 April 1833 – 30 May 1907) was an English botanist and taxonomist.
He was the son of William Masters, the nurseryman and botanist of Canterbury and author of Hortus duroverni.

Life
Tylden Masters studied at the King's College London and the University of St Andrews. He attended the lectures of Edward Forbes and John Lindley. His most famous works are Vegetable Teratology, which dealt with teratology (abnormal mutations) of vegetable species, and several works on Chinese plants (particularly conifers), describing many of the new species discovered by Ernest Henry Wilson.

The larch Larix mastersiana and the Nepenthes hybrid N. × mastersiana are named after Tylden Masters, among other plant species. Including a genus that was published in 1871, Maxwellia from New Caledonia.

Tylden Masters was the editor of the Gardeners' Chronicle between 1866 and 1907, which led to him corresponding with Charles Darwin. He was elected a fellow of the Royal Society in 1870.

He was made a correspondent of the Institute of France in 1888. He was also a chevalier of the order of Leopold.

Tylden Masters died at the Mount, Ealing, on 30 May 1907. His body was cremated at Woking. His obituary in The American Florist credited him with preventing Kew Gardens "from being handed over to a political clique", with the Royal Horticultural Society (RHS) holding onto its Chiswick Garden, and for preventing "confiscation" of the RHS Lindley Library "in the dark days of the society at South Kensington".

Family
In 1858, Tylden Masters married Ellen, daughter of William Tress, by whom he had four children. His wife and two daughters survived him.

Books

Notes

References

External links

 
 

Botanists with author abbreviations
English botanists
Fellows of the Royal Society
1833 births
1907 deaths
Alumni of King's College London
Alumni of the University of St Andrews